Trichastylopsis albidus is a longhorn beetle species of the subfamily Lamiinae described by John Lawrence LeConte in 1852.

References

Acanthocinini
Beetles described in 1852